Tony Walls (born January 16, 1990) is an American soccer player currently playing for the Milwaukee Wave in the Major Arena Soccer League.

Career

College and Amateur
Walls played four years of college soccer at the University of Wisconsin–Green Bay between 2008 and 2011. While at college, Walls also appeared for USL PDL club Michigan Bucks in 2011.

Professional
On January 17, 2012, Walls was drafted in the third round (47th overall) of the 2012 MLS Supplemental Draft by Chicago Fire. Walls appeared in 16/16 MLS reserve league matches.  Also appearing in matches against Santos Laguna from Liga MX and Aston Villa from the English Premier League. He spent 2012 with the club before being waived on February 21, 2013.

After spending 2013 with Professional Arena Soccer League team Milwaukee Wave, Walls returned to outdoor soccer when he signed for USL Pro club Rochester Rhinos on April 2, 2014. Following his first season with the Rhinos, Walls played in 28/29 matches, led the team in minutes (2,217) and won Team Defensive MVP for the 2014 season.

In 2015 Walls was named captain of the Rochester Rhinos who would go on to win the USL regular season championship, Eastern conference championship, and USL Championship.  The team conceded only 16 goals in 28 games, the fewest in league history, and lost only one match in 40 total competitions. Walls recorded 4 goals, 2 assists.  Walls appeared in every matched and started all but one, led the team in minutes and was named Team MVP, 1st team all-league, and finished third in the voting for league MVP.

In 2016, Walls went on trial with Houston Dynamo and both Minnesota United but returned to Rochester.  Walls endured a slew of injuries and recorded only one goal and one assist.

Walls signed with Saint Louis FC in April 2017.  Walls quickly became a mainstay for Preki, the US soccer legend.  Walls appeared in 23 matches and started 21.  He led the team in passes with 992, and passing percentage, recording 82.2% completion rate on the season.  Although signing a few games into the season, Walls finished second on the team in minutes with 1,953.

Walls was one of three players that returned to Saint Louis FC from 2017 under new head coach Anthony Pulis.  A partial calf tear only made Walls unavailable for 8 weeks after scoring in the first match of the season.  Walls managed to make 18 appearances and start 14 matches.  Walls would play a crucial role in Saint Louis FC making their first every playoff appearance, starting in the last 9 regular season matches.  Walls recorded 1,254 minutes, 83% passing completion percentage to go along with 2 goals on the season.

Walls would join the Ontario Fury of MASL for the 2018-2019 before signing with Chattanooga Red Wolves of USL league one for their inaugural season.

Walls signed with the USL Championship's Pittsburgh Riverhounds SC in January 2020.

Walls returned to the Milwaukee Wave on February 23, 2023.

References

External links
 
 

1990 births
Living people
American soccer players
Association football defenders
Chattanooga Red Wolves SC players
Chicago Fire FC draft picks
Chicago Fire FC players
Green Bay Phoenix men's soccer players
Major Arena Soccer League players
Major Indoor Soccer League (2008–2014) players
Flint City Bucks players
Milwaukee Wave players
Ontario Fury players
People from Wauwatosa, Wisconsin
Rochester New York FC players
Saint Louis FC players
Soccer players from Wisconsin
Sportspeople from the Milwaukee metropolitan area
USL Championship players
USL League Two players
USL League One players
St. Louis Ambush (2013–) players
Pittsburgh Riverhounds SC players